Wander Mateo (born 24 December 1989) is a Dominican judoka.

He participated at the 2016 Summer Olympics in Rio de Janeiro, in the men's 66 kg competition.

References

External links

1989 births
Living people
Dominican Republic male judoka
Olympic judoka of the Dominican Republic
Judoka at the 2016 Summer Olympics
Judoka at the 2015 Pan American Games
Judoka at the 2019 Pan American Games
Pan American Games medalists in judo
Pan American Games gold medalists for the Dominican Republic
Medalists at the 2019 Pan American Games
21st-century Dominican Republic people